Sri Lanka competed at the 1996 Summer Olympics in Atlanta, United States.

Athletics

 Chintaki De Zoysa
 Benny Fernando
 Susanthika Jayasinghe
 Sriyani Kulawansa
 Mahesh Perera
 Sugath Thilakaratne

Diving

Janaka Biyanwila
Men's 3m Springboard
 Preliminary Heat — 247.44 (→ did not advance, 35th place)

Shooting

 Pushpamali Ramanayake
 Malini Wickramasinghe
 Luck Rajasinghe

References
Official Olympic Reports
Sri Lanka at the 1996 Atlanta Summer Games

Nations at the 1996 Summer Olympics
1996
Summer Olympics